Ascot Stadium is a multi-purpose stadium in Gweru, Zimbabwe.  It is currently used mostly for football matches and serves as the home stadium for Hardbody F.C and Chapungu United.  The stadium has a capacity of 5,000 people. 

Football venues in Zimbabwe
Stadiums in Zimbabwe
Multi-purpose stadiums in Zimbabwe
Gweru
Buildings and structures in Midlands Province